Branbridges is a village in Kent, England, on the River Medway. It is near East Peckham, and the nearest railway station is Beltring.

Today it has practically merged with the neighbouring village of East Peckham, however it retains an industrial estate called Branbridges Estate, a disused water mill where the River Bourne flows, and a petrol station.

Villages in Kent